Football is the most popular sport in Niger, a nation of 18 million.

International
While popular, Niger have so far been rather unsuccessful in international football, never winning a major tournament and failing to qualify for any FIFA World Cup finals, though they did reach the quarterfinals of qualifying in 1982, before losing to Algeria, who qualified for the 1982 World Cup.  They either failed to qualify or were forced to withdraw from every African Nations Cup between 1969 and 2010. However, Niger did finally participate in the competition for the first time in 2012 after topping a qualifying group that included South Africa and Egypt. Later that year, they defeated Guinea over two legs to qualify for the 2013 Africa Cup of Nations. On both occasions, Niger finished bottom of their group, gaining a solitary point in 2013. 

As of 2021, there are no Nigerien nationals playing with top level European clubs. In the 2000s, a handful of Nigerien internationals have played in Europe including Moussa Yahaya at Legia Warsaw in Poland and Ibrahim Tankary in Belgium's Jupiler League. Moussa Narry, a Nigerien citizen but a Ghana international, played in the Netherlands and with AJ Auxerre and Le Mans FC of France.

Domestic
Football in Niger is almost entirely amateur, with some of the ten teams in the Niger Premier League (begun in 1966) being semi-professional. The Niger Cup (begun in 1974) is open to amateur leagues throughout the nation. League play has been dominated by clubs from the capital city of Niamey, with Sahel SC Niamey and Olympic FC de Niamey capturing almost two thirds of the titles between them. Below this there are numerous local and national amateur leagues and competitions. Many sections of the Nigerien government, notably the police and armed forces, sponsor amateur clubs.

Football's popularity, as well as the Nigerien people's passion for international football, was highlighted by former World Footballer of the Year Zinedine Zidane's visit to Niger in 2007.  Mobbed by fans at every stop, Zidane delivered funds and toured projects both football and development related.

Nigerien Football Topics
Nigerien Football Federation
Niger national football team

Nigerien Football Stadiums

Nigerien Footballers
 Ismaël Alassane
 Kassaly Daouda
 Alhassane Issoufou
 Daouda Kamilou
 Mohammed Muyei
 Moussa Narry
 Ibrahim Tankary
 Moussa Yahaya
 Moussa Maazou

Nigerien International Referees
Lucien Bouchardeau

References

FIFA: Nigerien Football Federation News and background. Retrieved 30 January 2008.
FIFA: Goal Programme - Nigerien Football Federation - 2006. Retrieved 30 January 2008.

External links
 Le Republicain-Niger daily, Sports section.